Pike State Forest may refer to:
Pike State Forest (Indiana)
Pike State Forest (Ohio)